Touraj Atabaki (born February 23, 1950) is Emeritus Professor by special appointment of Social History of the Middle East and Central Asia at the Leiden University. He  was the Senior Research Fellow at the International Institute of Social History in Amsterdam. He also held the chair of the Social History of the Middle East and Central Asia at the School of Middle East Studies of Leiden University, and is past president of the Association for Iranian Studies and the European Society for Central Asian Studies.

Atabaki earned his doctorate from Utrecht University in 1991 with a dissertation titled Ethnicity and autonomy in Iranian Azarbayjan : the autonomous government of Azarbayjan 1946.

Books
Atabaki's books include:
Iran in the 20th Century: Historiography and Political Culture (I. B. Tauris, 2009)
The State and the Subaltern: Modernization, Society and the State in Turkey and Iran (edited, I. B. Tauris, 2007)
Iran and the First World War: Battleground of the Great Powers (edited, I. B. Tauris, 2006)
Men of Order: Authoritarian Modernization under Atatürk and Reza Shah (I. B. Tauris, 2004)
Azerbaijan: Ethnicity and the Struggle for Power in Iran (I. B. Tauris, 2000)
Post-Soviet Central Asia (with John O'Kane, I. B. Tauris, 1998)
Azerbaijan: Ethnicity and Autonomy in Twentieth-Century Iran (British Academic Press, 1993)

References

1950 births
Living people
20th-century Dutch historians
20th-century Iranian historians
Social historians
Iranian emigrants to the Netherlands
Academic staff of Leiden University
Academic staff of the University of Amsterdam
Utrecht University alumni
Academic staff of Utrecht University
Writers from Tehran
21st-century Dutch historians